Insanity is a spectrum of behaviors characterized by certain abnormal mental or behavioral patterns.

Insanity may also refer to:

Television and film
 Insanity (2015 film), a Chinese-Hong Kong film
 Insanity (2019 film), a Finnish film
 Insanity (TV series), an 2021 Brazilian psychological thriller television series

Music
 Insanity (album), a 2001 album by Darkane, reissued in 2011 and 2012
 "Insanity" (song), a 2007 song by Darin Zanyar
 "Insanity", a 1991 song by Oceanic
 "Insanity", a 1994 song by Oingo Boingo from the album Boingo

Other uses
 Insanity defense, a legal defense in a criminal case
 Insanity (ride), an amusement ride at the Stratosphere, Las Vegas, Nevada, US
 Insanity (radio), a community radio station based at Royal Holloway, University of London
 Insanity (home exercise system), a workout regimen offered by Beachbody

See also 
 Insane (disambiguation)